Patricia Ana Matrai is a marine scientist known for her work on the cycling of sulfur. She is a senior research scientist at Bigelow Laboratory for Ocean Sciences.

Education and career 
Matrai is originally from Chile. Matria has a B.A. from the Universidad de Concepción (1981), an M.S. (1984) and a Ph.D. (1988) from Scripps Institution of Oceanography and the University of California San Diego. Following her Ph.D. she moved to the University of Miami. She became a senior research scientist at Bigelow Laboratory for Ocean Sciences in 1995.

Research 
Matrai is known for her work on marine aerosols, especially those that contain sulfur. She has examined the production of sulfur compounds by coccolithophores, a type of phytoplankton. She has also examined the amount of organic sulfur inside phytoplankton cells and during phytoplankton blooms. Matrai has worked on the impact of declines in sea ice and how primary production is measured in the Arctic. In 2001 she went to the North Pole on an icebreaker where she studied aerosols produced by phytoplankton. She also does work on outreach and mentoring children to introduce them to science

Selected publications

Awards and honors 
In 2017 Matrai was named a fellow of the Association for the Sciences of Limnology and Oceanography.

References

External links 

 

Living people
Women climatologists
University of California, San Diego alumni
University of Concepción alumni
Women oceanographers
Geochemists
Year of birth missing (living people)